The Women's U23 road race at the 2006 European Road Championships took place on July 15. The Championships were hosted by the Dutch city of Valkenburg. The course was 110 km long and started in the morning.

Final classification

References

External links

2006 European Road Championships
2006 in women's road cycling
European Road Championships – Women's U23 road race